The 2012 Six-red World Championship (often styled the 2012 SangSom 6-red World Championship for sponsorship and marketing purposes) was a six-red snooker tournament held between 2 and 7 July 2012 at the Montien Riverside Hotel in Bangkok, Thailand. The highest break of the tournament was 75, compiled by both Judd Trump and Shaun Murphy.

Mark Selby was the defending champion, but he lost in the quarter-finals 5–7 against Trump.

Mark Davis won his second Six-reds World Championship title after 2009, by defeating Murphy 8–4 in the final.

Prize money
The breakdown of prize money for this year is shown below:
Winner: 2,000,000 baht
Runner-up: 800,000 baht
Semi-finalists: 400,000 baht
Quarter-finalists: 200,000 baht
Last 16: 100,000 baht
Last 32: 50,000 baht
Total: 6,000,000 baht

Round-robin stage
The top four players from each group qualified for the knock-out stage. All matches were best of 9 frames.

Group A

 Joe Perry 5–0 Andy Lee
 Mark Selby 5–1 Shachar Ruberg
 Andy Lee 0–5 Dechawat Poomjaeng
 Dominic Dale 5–4 Shachar Ruberg
 Dominic Dale 5–3 Andy Lee
 Mark Selby 5–2 Joe Perry
 Shachar Ruberg 1–5 Dechawat Poomjaeng
 Mark Selby 5–1 Andy Lee
 Dominic Dale 3–5 Dechawat Poomjaeng
 Joe Perry 5–4 Shachar Ruberg
 Joe Perry 5–2 Dechawat Poomjaeng
 Mark Selby 5–3 Dominic Dale
 Mark Selby 5–0 Dechawat Poomjaeng
 Andy Lee 4–5 Shachar Ruberg
 Dominic Dale 5–2 Joe Perry

Group B

 Judd Trump 2–5 Barry Hawkins
 Mohamed Khairy 1–5 Rodney Goggins
 Nick Jennings 2–5 Issara Kachaiwong
 Barry Hawkins 3–5 Rodney Goggins
 Nick Jennings 5–3 Mohamed Khairy
 Judd Trump 5–1 Issara Kachaiwong
 Rodney Goggins 5–4 Issara Kachaiwong
 Judd Trump 5–0 Nick Jennings
 Barry Hawkins 5–1 Mohamed Khairy
 Barry Hawkins 4–5 Issara Kachaiwong
 Judd Trump 1–5 Rodney Goggins
 Mohamed Khairy 2–5 Issara Kachaiwong
 Judd Trump 5–3 Mohamed Khairy
 Barry Hawkins 5–4 Nick Jennings
 Nick Jennings 2–5 Rodney Goggins

Group C

 Peter Ebdon 3–5 Ken Doherty
 Li Hang 4–5 Aditya Mehta Li Hang 1–5 Ken Doherty Aditya Mehta 5–4 Thanawat Thirapongpaiboon
 Mark Williams 5–1 Peter Ebdon
 Mark Williams 5–4 Aditya Mehta
 Ken Doherty 2–5 Thanawat Thirapongpaiboon Peter Ebdon 5–2 Li Hang
 Mark Williams 5–1 Li Hang
 Peter Ebdon 3–5 Thanawat Thirapongpaiboon Aditya Mehta 5–2 Ken Doherty
 Li Hang 4–5 Thanawat Thirapongpaiboon Mark Williams 4–5 Ken Doherty Peter Ebdon 5–4 Aditya Mehta
 Mark Williams 5–1 Thanawat Thirapongpaiboon

Group D

 Stephen Maguire 0–5 Hossein Vafaei Mohammed Ibrahim 2–5 James Wattana Mark Davis 5–3 Darren Morgan
 Hossein Vafaei 5–1 Mohammed Ibrahim
 Mark Davis 5–4 James Wattana
 Stephen Maguire 3–5 Darren Morgan Mark Davis 3–5 Hossein Vafaei Mohammed Ibrahim 1–5 Darren Morgan Darren Morgan 3–5 James Wattana Stephen Maguire 5–1 Mohammed Ibrahim
 Stephen Maguire 2–5 Mark Davis Hossein Vafaei 1–5 Darren Morgan Stephen Maguire 3–5 James Wattana Mark Davis 5–4 Mohammed Ibrahim
 Hossein Vafaei 5–3 James Wattana

Group E

 Shaun Murphy 4–5 Andrew Higginson Ben Nunan 4–5 Pankaj Advani Steve Davis 1–5 Thepchaiya Un-Nooh Shaun Murphy 5–0 Ben Nunan
 Pankaj Advani 5–4 Thepchaiya Un-Nooh
 Andrew Higginson 0–5 Steve Davis Andrew Higginson 5–2 Pankaj Advani
 Ben Nunan 2–5 Thepchaiya Un-Nooh Shaun Murphy 5–1 Steve Davis
 Ben Nunan 3–5 Steve Davis Shaun Murphy 5–3 Pankaj Advani
 Andrew Higginson 1–5 Thepchaiya Un-Nooh Pankaj Advani 4–5 Steve Davis Shaun Murphy 5–0 Thepchaiya Un-Nooh
 Andrew Higginson 5–1 Ben Nunan 

Group F

 Saleh Mohammad 4–5 Passakorn Suwannawat Stephen Lee 5–3 Jimmy White
 Ben Judge 3–5 Passakorn Suwannawat Saleh Mohammad 5–3 Jimmy White
 Stuart Bingham 5–1 Ben Judge
 Stuart Bingham 4–5 Jimmy White Stephen Lee 5–3 Saleh Mohammad
 Jimmy White 5–2 Passakorn Suwannawat
 Stephen Lee 2–5 Stuart Bingham Ben Judge 4–5 Saleh Mohammad Stephen Lee 5–0 Ben Judge
 Stuart Bingham 5–3 Passakorn Suwannawat
 Ben Judge 4–5 Jimmy White Stephen Lee 5–0 Passakorn Suwannawat
 Stuart Bingham 4–5 Saleh MohammadGroup G

 Marcus Campbell 5–0 Krzysztof Wróbel
 Tom Ford 5–1 Noppon Saengkham
 Matthew Stevens 5–3 Marcus Campbell
 Ricky Walden 3–5 Noppon Saengkham Tom Ford 5–3 Krzysztof Wróbel
 Matthew Stevens 3–5 Noppon Saengkham Ricky Walden 5–0 Krzysztof Wróbel
 Matthew Stevens 5–2 Krzysztof Wróbel
 Ricky Walden 5–2 Tom Ford
 Marcus Campbell 4–5 Noppon Saengkham Matthew Stevens 2–5 Ricky Walden Tom Ford 5–2 Marcus Campbell
 Ricky Walden 5–2 Marcus Campbell
 Matthew Stevens 5–4 Tom Ford
 Krzysztof Wróbel 3–5 Noppon SaengkhamGroup H

 Martin Gould 5–2 Panompai Powises
 Lee Walker 5–4 Zhang Anda
 Martin Gould 5–4 Zhang Anda
 Lee Walker 5–4 Marco Fu
 Graeme Dott 4–5 Panompai Powises Marco Fu 5–3 Panompai Powises
 Graeme Dott 5–3 Zhang Anda
 Martin Gould 4–5 Lee Walker Zhang Anda 3–5 Marco Fu Graeme Dott 3–5 Lee Walker Martin Gould 2–5 Marco Fu Lee Walker 5–1 Panompai Powises
 Graeme Dott 5–0 Martin Gould
 Graeme Dott 4–5 Marco Fu Zhang Anda 1–5 Panompai Powises'''

Knockout stage

References

External links

2012
Six-red World Championship
Six-red World Championship